Shah Alborz is a mountain peak in Alborz range in Iran. At an elevation of  it is the highest peak in the range. Its north face rises from the Alamout valley, to the south lies the Taleghan Valley and to the west, the plains of east-Ghazvin.

Climbing 
The level of difficulty is "walk-up" and the nearest center is Taleghan.  The best months to climb the mountain are from March to September.  The most often-used route to the peak passes through the Hasanjoon valley.

References 

Mountains of Iran
Mountaineering in Iran
Landforms of Tehran Province
Landforms of Qazvin Province
Four-thousanders of the Alborz
Mountains of Qazvin Province